Grafovka is a rural locality (a settlement) and the administrative center of Grafovskoye Rural Settlement, Krasnoyaruzhsky District, Belgorod Oblast, Russia. The population was 624 as of 2010. There are 12 streets.

Geography 
Grafovka is located 26 km northwest of Krasnaya Yaruga (the district's administrative centre) by road. Repyakhovka is the nearest rural locality.

References 

Rural localities in Krasnoyaruzhsky District